Goudge is a surname. Notable people with the surname include:

Chris Goudge (1935–2010), British hurdler
Elizabeth Goudge (1900–1984), English writer
Henry Goudge (1805–1841), Canadian merchant and politician
Monson Henry Goudge (1829–1919), Canadian merchant and politician
Stephen T. Goudge, Canadian judge
T. A. Goudge (1910–1999), Canadian philosopher and academic